Bobby Joseph Hebert Jr. (surname pronounced  ; born August 19, 1960) is an American sportscaster and former professional football quarterback. He played in the United States Football League (USFL) and National Football League (NFL) from 1983 to 1996 for the Michigan Panthers, Oakland Invaders, New Orleans Saints, and Atlanta Falcons. Nicknamed the "Cajun Cannon", Hebert led the Panthers to the USFL championship in the league's inaugural season. Later he helped bring the Saints their first winning season and playoff appearance in franchise history. Hebert was inducted to the New Orleans Saints Hall of Fame in 1999 and the Louisiana Sports Hall of Fame in 2000.  He currently hosts an afternoon radio show on WWL AM 870 and WWL-FM 105.3 in New Orleans.

Playing career

USFL
Hebert was among the greatest quarterbacks in the USFL's short history. In 1983, he won the USFL championship with the Michigan Panthers, defeating the Philadelphia Stars, 24–22. The team struggled a bit with injuries in 1984 and a weakened squad was knocked out of the playoffs by Steve Young's Los Angeles Express 27–21 in triple OT.  In 1985, the Panthers were merged with the Oakland Invaders and Hebert again led his team to the finals against the Stars. This time Hebert's team fell short and the Stars won 28–24. In three years in the USFL, Hebert completed 773 of 1,407 passes for 13,137 passing yards. He is the USFL's all-time leader in passing yardage.

USFLOnline.com: Hebert remembers when the Panthers were the “Talk-of-the-Town” in the city of Detroit. “We were a lot more popular than the Lions were,” he says. “We won the USFL Championship after Detroit not having a champion since the Bobby Layne days in the 1950s.”

Hebert, with a confident tone in his voice, says, “I think we would have been in the top 14 of the NFL if we [Panthers] played them. We didn't have the depth as the NFL, but we had a good chance to win because the guys that started on the Panthers also started in the NFL later on.”

NFL
In 1985, his rookie season with the NFL's New Orleans Saints, and in 1986, he split time with quarterback Dave Wilson. In 1987, he was made starting quarterback with John Fourcade as backup. In week 12 of the 1988 NFL Season on November 20, Hebert completed 20 of 23 passes for 194 yards and 3 touchdown passes in the Saints' 42-0 rout over the Denver Broncos, for his efforts he was named the Associated Press NFC Offensive Player of the week. Hebert sat out the entire 1990 season in a contract dispute. In 1991 and 1992 he led the Saints to excellent starts and impressive playoff appearances. For leading the 1991 Saints to their "best start ever," Hebert was honored by gracing the front cover of the October 7, 1991 Sports Illustrated. In 1993, he was signed by the Atlanta Falcons and was selected for the Pro Bowl that season. He continued to play for the Atlanta Falcons as a backup to Jeff George in 1994 and 1995, and he was named starter again in 1996. Hebert retired after his 1996 season with the Falcons.

References

1960 births
Living people
American football quarterbacks
Atlanta Falcons players
Cajun sportspeople
Michigan Panthers players
National Conference Pro Bowl players
New Orleans Saints players
Northwestern State Demons football players
Oakland Invaders players
People from Cut Off, Louisiana
Players of American football from Louisiana
American sports radio personalities
Ed Block Courage Award recipients